This is a list of African-American newspapers that have been published in the state of Arizona.  It includes both current and historical newspapers.

The first African-American newspaper in Arizona was the Phoenix Tribune, which was published from 1918 to the 1940s.  Notable such newspapers in Arizona today include the Arizona Informant.

Newspapers

See also 

 List of African-American newspapers and media outlets
 List of African-American newspapers in California
 List of African-American newspapers in Colorado
 List of African-American newspapers in Nevada
 List of African-American newspapers in New Mexico
 List of African-American newspapers in Utah
 List of newspapers in Arizona

Works cited

References 

Newspapers
Arizona
African-American
African-American newspapers